The Italian Synagogue is one of five synagogues in the Venetian Ghetto of Venice.

History
The Italian Synagogue was built in 1575 to serve the needs of the Italian Jews, the poorest group living in the Venetian Ghetto. As such, it is the smallest, and the most simple of the five synagogues. Like the other four synagogues in Venice, it was termed a scuola ("School"), rather than sinagoga ("Synagogue"), in the same way in which Ashkenazi Jews refer to the synagogue as the shul ("School"). The synagogue was restored to its current state in 1970.

It was a clandestine synagogue, tolerated on the condition that it be concealed within a building that gives no appearance being a house of worship form the exterior, although the interior is elaborately decorated.

Interior
The synagogue, which is quite small, accommodates only 25 worshipers. The main features of the room are the Bimah and the Ark. Four large windows illuminate the room from the south side of the campo of the Ghetto Nuovo.

References

Sources
Venice of the Faiths - Itinerary
Kiddush in Venice
Jewish Virtual Library
Discovering Ghetto - Itinerary

Synagogues in Venice
16th-century synagogues
Religious buildings and structures completed in 1575
1570s establishments in the Republic of Venice
Italki Jews topics